Musciame or mosciame is a traditional Italian preserved meat made from the salted and sun-dried flesh of dolphins. It is black, and looks like a piece of charred wood hanging from a string. It was made by the sailors and fishermen of the coast of Liguria and Versilia; under European law, it may no longer be legally produced or sold. A somewhat similar product in Sicily made from fillet of tuna, often sold as "mosciame di tonno", is essentially the same as the mojama de atún of Spain.

Production 

Musciame was made on board ship by the sailors and fishermen of the Ligurian and Versilian coast, in north-west Italy. Strips of dolphin meat were salted, then hung by a string from the mast to dry in the sun for about a week. The result had the appearance of a small log charred by fire. The meat was black, and became hard if kept for long.

Musciame may not legally be sold or produced in Italy. Intentional killing of dolphins is prohibited by the Habitats Directive of the European Union, 92/43/CEE. Under the terms of EU regulation 338/97, where cetaceans are listed in Appendix A, it is illegal to buy, sell or obtain dolphin meat. In 2014, after an exposé by an investigative reporter from the television programme Le Iene, the Guardia Costiera and the port authorities of Civitavecchia confiscated vacuum-packed musciame destined to be secretly served in a restaurant in the area, and investigated those responsible for trafficking in it.

Consumption 

Musciame was a basic element of the diet of Ligurian seamen, who ate it with ship's biscuit softened with sea-water and vinegar, accompanied by vegetables. It is eaten very thinly sliced; it may be simply seasoned with olive oil, or served on slices of tomato, or accompanied by boiled beans and onion. If the meat is particularly hard it may need to be softened by soaking in cold water for a few hours.

Musciame di tonno 
Dolphin musciame may be substituted with a similar food, musciame di tonno, which is made from fillet of tuna. It is prepared in the summer months by salting strips of tuna fillet from the large conical muscle known as bodano, which are then sun-dried, smoked, or – more often – dried in a warm oven.

See also
 Cuisine of Liguria
 List of Italian dishes

References

Dried meat
Gastronomy in Italy
Cuisine of Liguria
Dolphins